Darío Amaral (born 23 May 1932) is a Brazilian fencer. He competed in the individual and team épée events at the 1952 and 1968 Summer Olympics.

References

External links
 

1932 births
Living people
Brazilian male épée fencers
Olympic fencers of Brazil
Fencers at the 1952 Summer Olympics
Fencers at the 1968 Summer Olympics
Sportspeople from São Paulo
Pan American Games medalists in fencing
20th-century Brazilian people
Pan American Games silver medalists for Brazil
Medalists at the 1967 Pan American Games
Fencers at the 1967 Pan American Games